North Cimahi is a district of Cimahi, West Java, Indonesia. North Cimahi had a population of 158,633 in 2014.

Villages 
North Cimahi is divided into four villages:

References 

Districts of Cimahi